The Black Cauldron is a 1985 American animated dark fantasy adventure film produced by Walt Disney Productions in association with Silver Screen Partners II and released by Walt Disney Pictures. The 25th Disney animated feature film, it is loosely based on the first two books in The Chronicles of Prydain by Lloyd Alexander, a series of five novels that are, in turn, based on Welsh mythology.

Set in the mythical land of Prydain during the Early Middle Ages, the film centers on a wicked emperor known as the Horned King, who hopes to secure an ancient magical cauldron that will aid him in his desire to conquer the world. He is opposed by young swineherder Taran, the young Princess Eilonwy, the harp-playing bard Fflewddur Fflam, and a friendly wild creature named Gurgi, who seek to destroy the cauldron to prevent the Horned King from ruling the world.

The film is directed by Ted Berman and Richard Rich, who had directed Disney's previous animated film The Fox and the Hound (1981), and was the first Disney animated film to be recorded in Dolby Stereo. Disney acquired the film rights to the books in 1973 with production beginning in 1980 to be set for a Christmas 1984 release. During production, it had a severe editing process, particularly for its climactic sequence, which proved to be disturbing to children. The newly appointed Walt Disney Studios chairman Jeffrey Katzenberg ordered those scenes to be cut, fearing that it would alienate children, and as a result, it was delayed to 1985. It features the voices of Grant Bardsley, Susan Sheridan, Freddie Jones, Nigel Hawthorne, Arthur Malet, John Byner, Phil Fondacaro and John Hurt. The narration of the movie is provided by famed actor and director John Huston.

It was the first Disney animated film to receive a PG rating as well as the first Disney animated film to feature computer-generated imagery. The film was distributed theatrically through Buena Vista Distribution on July 24, 1985 to mixed reviews, with critics voicing disapproval of its dark nature and disjointed writing, though the animation, soundtrack, and voice acting were praised. Being the most expensive animated film ever made at the time, it was a box-office bomb, grossing just $21 million against a budget of $44 million, putting the future of Disney's animation department in jeopardy. Because of its commercial failure, Disney did not release the film on home media until 1998. It has since gained a cult following.

Plot 

In the land of Prydain, Taran, a teenage "assistant pig-keeper" on the small farm of Caer Dallben, home of Dallben the Enchanter, dreams of becoming a famous warrior. Dallben learns that the evil Horned King is searching for a mystical relic known as the Black Cauldron, which can create an invincible army of undead warriors: the "Cauldron-Born". Dallben fears that the Horned King might use his pig, Hen Wen, who has oracular powers, to locate the cauldron. Dallben directs Taran to take Hen Wen to safety; unfortunately, Taran's foolish daydreaming causes Hen Wen to be captured by Gwythaints, the Horned King's dragon-like creatures.

Taran follows them to the Horned King's castle and meets the pestering dog-like creature, Gurgi, who wants to be his friend. Frustrated by Gurgi's antics and cowardice, Taran leaves him. Taran sneaks into the castle and helps Hen Wen escape but is captured and thrown into the dungeon. Another captive named Princess Eilonwy frees him as she tries to escape. In the catacombs underneath the castle, Taran and Eilonwy discover the ancient burial chamber of a king. Taran arms himself with the king's sword which contains magic that allows him to effectively fight the Horned King's minions, thus fulfilling his dream. Along with a third prisoner, the comical middle-aged bard Fflewddur Fflam, they escape from the castle and are found by Gurgi. Upon learning that Taran has escaped, the Horned King orders his goblin and chief henchman, Creeper, to send the Gwythaints to follow and capture Taran along with his friends.

Following Hen Wen's trail, the four companions stumble into the underground kingdom of the Fair Folk who have Hen Wen under their protection. When the kindly King Eidilleg reveals the cauldron's location, Taran decides to destroy it. Eilonwy, Gurgi and Fflewddur agree to join him and Eidilleg's obnoxious right-hand man Doli is assigned to lead them to the Marshes of Morva while the Fair Folk escort Hen Wen back to Caer Dallben. At Morva, they learn the cauldron is held by three witches—the crafty leader Orddu, the greedy Orgoch, and the more benevolent Orwen (who falls in love with Fflewddur at first sight). Orddu agrees to trade the cauldron for Taran's sword and he reluctantly agrees, knowing that it will cost his chance for heroism. Before vanishing, the witches reveal the cauldron is indestructible, and its power can only be broken when someone willingly climbs into it, which will kill them. Doli angrily abandons the group. Although Taran feels foolish for trading the sword for nothing, his companions show their belief in him. Eilonwy and Taran almost kiss as Fflewddur and Gurgi happily watch. Suddenly they are found by the Horned King's minions who had followed them. Gurgi runs away before they take the cauldron and the three companions back to the castle. The Horned King uses the cauldron to raise the dead and his Cauldron-born army begins to pour out into the world while holding the trio prisoners in view of the cauldron.

Gurgi, deciding not to abandon his friends this time, sneaks into the castle and rescues them. Taran decides to jump into the cauldron to save everyone, but Gurgi stops him and jumps in instead, killing the Cauldron-born as well as himself. When the Horned King spots Taran, he blames him, saying that Taran has interfered for the last time, and throws the youth toward the cauldron. But the cauldron is out of control and consumes the Horned King in a tunnel of fire, killing him and destroying the castle, using up all its powers forever, as the companions escape.

The three witches come to recover the now-inert Black Cauldron. Taran has finally realized Gurgi's true friendship while hailing him as a hero, and asks them to revive his friend in exchange for the cauldron, choosing to give up his magical sword permanently. Upon hearing Fflewddur's challenging remarks to demonstrate their powers, the reluctant witches honor the request, returning Gurgi to them. Gurgi is resurrected much to everyone's joy. After they reunite, he pushes Taran and Eilonwy into a kiss. The four friends then journey back home to Caer Dallben where Dallben and Doli watch them in a vision created by Hen Wen, and Dallben finally praises Taran for his heroism.

Voice cast 
 Grant Bardsley as Taran
 Susan Sheridan as Princess Eilonwy
 Freddie Jones as Dallben
 Nigel Hawthorne as Fflewddur Fflam
 Arthur Malet as King Eidilleg
 John Byner as Gurgi and Doli
 Phil Fondacaro as Creeper
 John Hurt as The Horned King
 Eda Reiss Merin as Orddu
 Adele Malis-Morey as Orwen
 Billie Hayes as Orgoch
 Wayne Allwine, Bill Farmer, James Almanzar, Fondacaro, Steve Hale, Jack Laing, Phil Nibbelink, and Peter Renaday as the Horned King's Henchmen 
 John Huston as Narrator

Production

Development  
Walt Disney Productions optioned Lloyd Alexander's five-volume series in 1971, and pre-production work began in 1973 when the film rights to Alexander's books were finally obtained. According to Ollie Johnston, it was he and Frank Thomas that convinced the studio to produce the movie, and that if it had been done properly, it might be "as good as Snow White". Because of the numerous storylines, and with over thirty characters in the original series, several story artists and animators worked on the film's development throughout the 1970s. When The Rescuers (1977) was completed, The Black Cauldron was tentatively scheduled to be released in 1980. Veteran artist Mel Shaw created inspirational conceptual pastel sketches, which future Disney president and CEO Ron Miller considered to be too advanced for the newly hired animators. 

Therefore, by August 1978, the studio had pushed its release date back to Christmas 1984 due to their inability to animate realistic human characters; its original release date was later assumed by The Fox and the Hound (1981). During its development limbo, storyboard artist Vance Gerry was selected to create beat storyboards that would outline the plot, action, and locations. Having established the three principal characters, Gerry adapted the Horned King into a big-bellied Viking who had a red beard, fiery temper, and wore a steel helmet with two large horns. Meanwhile, the studio hired Rosemary Anne Sisson as they desired an experienced British screenwriter for the film.

Animator John Musker was the film's initial director, having been offered the position by production head Tom Wilhite. As director, Musker was assigned to expand several sequences in the first act, but they were eventually deemed too comedic. Musker explained, "...the older people I was working with didn't like any of my ideas." When production on The Fox and the Hound (1981) had wrapped, several feature animation directors Art Stevens, Richard Rich, Ted Berman, and Dave Michener became involved in The Black Cauldron. When Miller decided too many people were involved, he decided Stevens was not appropriate to supervise the project so he contacted Joe Hale, who was a longtime layout artist at Disney Studios, to serve as producer.

With Hale as producer, actual production on The Black Cauldron officially began in 1980. He tossed out visual character artwork submitted by Tim Burton, and along with Rich and Berman, they desired a Sleeping Beauty (1959)–style approach. Both directors brought Milt Kahl out of retirement to create new character designs for Taran, Eilonwy, Fflewddur Fflam, and the other principal characters. Hale and the story team (including two story artists David Jonas and Al Wilson that he added) heavily revised the film, by which they capsulized the stories of the first two books. They also made some considerable changes, which led to Sisson's departure as she developed creative differences with Hale and the directors. 

Animators John Musker and Ron Clements, also citing creative differences, were removed from the project and began development on The Great Mouse Detective (1986). Displeased with Gerry's concept for the Horned King, Hale turned the Horned King into a thin creature donning a hood and carrying a spectral presence with shadowed face and glowing red eyes. His role was then expanded into a composite villain of several characters from the books. Taran and Eilonwy eventually acquired elements of the past designs and costumes of earlier Disney characters, especially the latter, who was drawn to resemble Princess Aurora.

Casting 
According to Musker, Gary Burghoff of M*A*S*H fame had auditioned as Gurgi. He tried numerous vocal iterations since Ted Berman had no idea how the character should sound like. After three hours, the directors grew frustrated and Burghoff, who had refused to leave, was thrown out of the studio. By 1982, John Byner, an impressionist, had been cast in the part. After Bryner was shown the character concepts for Gurgi, he felt inspired to add a "child's inflection" when creating the voice.

In January 1981, Hayley Mills stated she was being considered for the voice of Eilonwy. That same year, Mills hosted an episode of NBC's Disney's Wonderful World, in which she met with Hale and the directors to discuss the part. The role eventually went to Susan Sheridan. According to Sheridan, she recorded the voice on three separate trips to the Disney studios. In a 1983 Disney Channel special titled Backstage at Disney, Hale stated that Jonathan Winters was voicing King Eidilleg. The role eventually went to Arthur Malet.

Test-screening and editing 
Shortly before the film's initially planned 1984 theatrical release, a test screening for the rough cut of The Black Cauldron was held at the studio's private theater in Burbank, California. After the film, particularly the climactic "cauldron-born" sequence, proved to be too intense and disturbing for the majority of the children in the audience (most of whom ran out of the theater in terror before it was even finished), the newly appointed Disney studio chairman Jeffrey Katzenberg ordered certain scenes from The Black Cauldron be cut, as a result of the length and the fear that their nature would alienate children. Since animated films were generally edited in storyboard form using Leica reels (later known as animatics: storyboards shot sequentially and set to temporary audio tracks), producer Joe Hale objected to Katzenberg's demands. Katzenberg responded by having the film brought into an edit bay and editing the film himself.

Informed of what Katzenberg was doing by Hale, the newly appointed Disney CEO Michael Eisner called Katzenberg in the editing room and convinced him to stop. Though he did what Eisner insisted, Katzenberg requested that the film be modified, and delayed its scheduled Christmas 1984 release to July 1985 so that the film could be reworked.

The film was ultimately cut by twelve minutes, with existing scenes rewritten and reanimated for continuity. Many of the deleted scenes involved extended character interactions, but other edits involved violent content, including the undead "Cauldron-Born", who are used as the Horned King's army in the film's final act. While most of the scenes were seamlessly removed from the film, the Cauldron-Born sequence contains rather recognizable lapses because the removal of the scenes of the Cauldron-Born mauling the henchmen, as well as one of them being dissolved by the mist, creates a jump in the film's soundtrack.

Animation 
Invented by David W. Spencer from the studio's still camera department, the animation photo transfer process (APT) was first used for The Black Cauldron which would enhance the technology by which the rough animation would be processed onto celluloid. First, the rough animation would be photographed onto high-contrast lithographic film, and the resulting negative would be copied onto the plastic cel sheets that would transfer lines and the colors which eventually eliminated the hand-inking process. However, as the APT-transferred line art would fade off of the cels over time, most of the film's animation was done using the xerographic process, which had been used by Disney since the late 1950s. Spencer would win a technical Academy Award for this process, but the computer would soon render the APT process obsolete.

The Black Cauldron is notable for being Disney's first animated feature film to incorporate computer-generated imagery in its animation for bubbles, a boat, a floating orb of light, and the cauldron itself. Though The Black Cauldron was released a year before The Great Mouse Detective, both films were in production simultaneously for some time and the computer graphics for the latter were done first. When producer Joe Hale heard about what was being done, the possibilities made him excited and he made the crew from The Great Mouse Detective project create some computer animation for his own film. For other effects, animator Don Paul used live action footage of dry ice mists to create the steam and smoke coming out of the cauldron.

Soundtrack 

Unlike most other Disney animated films, the film did not contain any songs. The score is composed and conducted by Elmer Bernstein; he used the ondes Martenot to build upon the dark mood of Prydain, an instrument he used in Trading Places (1983) and Ghostbusters (1984).

Due to last minute revisions, much of Bernstein's score were cut from the film. In its minority, the score was re-recorded for the album original release by Varèse Sarabande in 1985, with the composer conducting the Utah Symphony Orchestra. The album soon fell out of print and many of the film's tracks did not resurface until a bootleg copy entitled "Taran" was supplied to soundtrack specialty outlets in 1986. The film tracks received their premiere release in 2012 as part of Intrada Records' partnership with Walt Disney Records to issue several Disney film soundtracks.

Release 
For its initial release, the film became the first Disney animated film to receive a PG rating from the Motion Picture Association. It was also presented in Super Technirama 70—the first since Sleeping Beauty—and Dolby Stereo 70mm six-track surround sound. The film's initial theatrical release was accompanied by the Donald Duck short Chips Ahoy.

The film was re-released in 1990 in selected markets under the title Taran and the Magic Cauldron.

Box office 
The Black Cauldron was released in North America on July 24, 1985. Two days later, the film was also screened at Radio City Music Hall in New York City. While officially budgeted by Disney executives at $25 million, the film's production manager, Don Hahn, said in his documentary, Waking Sleeping Beauty, that it cost $44 million to produce the film. The $44-million budget made it the most expensive animated film ever made at the time. The film grossed $21.3 million domestically. It resulted in a loss for Walt Disney Productions and put the future of the animation department in jeopardy (earning it the nickname "the film that almost killed Disney"). It was not distributed as a home video release for more than a decade after its theatrical run after its poor performance. Adding insult to injury, the film was also outgrossed by The Care Bears Movie ($22.9 million domestically), which was released four months earlier by the much-smaller Canadian animation studio  Nelvana. The film was however more successful outside North America, notably in France, where it had 3,074,481 admissions and was the fifth most attended film of the year.

The film was the last Disney animated film to be completed at the original Animation Building of the Walt Disney Studios (Walt Disney Productions) in Burbank, California. The animation department was moved to the Air Way facility in nearby Glendale in December 1984, and, following corporate restructuring, eventually returned to the Burbank studio in the mid-1990s at a new facility.

Reception and legacy 
The critics' consensus reads: "Ambitious but flawed, The Black Cauldron is technically brilliant as usual, but lacks the compelling characters of other Disney animated classics." On Metacritic, the film had a weighted average score of 59 out of 100, based on 16 critics, indicating "mixed or average reviews".

Roger Ebert of Chicago Sun-Times gave the film 3.5 stars out of 4, praising the film as "a rip-roaring tale of swords and sorcery, evil and revenge, magic and pluck and luck... And it takes us on a journey through a kingdom of some of the more memorable characters in any recent Disney film." He noted how "involving" the story was, and felt "the key to the movie is in the richness of the characterizations, and the two best characters, I think, are the Horned King and a fuzzy little creature named Gurgi."

Charles Solomon of the Los Angeles Times wrote that the "highly dimensional sound track, with its opulent Elmer Bernstein score and excellent vocal performances, is a technological work of art. But it is the animation itself with some of the best work the studio has produced since Walt Disney's death in 1966 that dazzles the viewer." He felt that if "its script and direction were equal to the animation, Cauldron would be a masterpiece to rank with Snow White and Pinocchio, instead of the frustrating, beautiful, exciting and ultimately unsatisfying film that it is."

Walter Goodman, reviewing for The New York Times, praised the animation and John Hurt's performance, but believed "[p]eople old enough to recall their delight at earlier feature animations, no doubt burnished by memory, are not of course the audience at which The Black Cauldron is aimed. Nor, apparently, is it aimed at youngsters who have had a taste of more sophisticated animation of the Star Wars breed of movies."

London's Time Out magazine deemed it "a major disappointment", adding that "the charm, characterization and sheer good humor" found in previous Disney efforts "are sadly absent".

Charles Champlin, also from the Los Angeles Times, wrote that The Black Cauldron lacks "the simplicity and the clarity of great fairy tales, or the child-sized wonder of Margery Sharp's stories that became The Rescuers, the last really successful Disney animated feature. One wonderful chase in the old riotously inventive slapstick tradition and two minor comic figures suggest the pleasures that can result when the inventing animators have a fertile ground to start from. But a lot of the way the film seems to be dutifully following a rather cumbersome and not overly attractive story."

Jeffrey Katzenberg, then-chairman of the Walt Disney Studios, was dismayed by the product and the animators believed that it lacked "the humor, pathos, and the fantasy which had been so strong in Lloyd Alexander's work. The story had been a once-in-a-lifetime opportunity and it was heartbreaking to see such wonderful material wasted."

Lloyd Alexander, the author of the books on which the film was based, had a more complicated reaction to the film:
First, I have to say, there is no resemblance between the movie and the book. Having said that, the movie in itself, purely as a movie, I found to be very enjoyable. I had fun watching it. What I would hope is that anyone who sees the movie would certainly enjoy it, but I'd also hope that they'd actually read the book. The book is quite different. It's a very powerful, very moving story, and I think people would find a lot more depth in the book.

Home media 
The Black Cauldron was first released on VHS in the United Kingdom in 1997, and in the United States on August 4, 1998, as part of the Walt Disney Masterpiece Collection, in a pan-and-scan transfer, 13 years after its theatrical release. The film received a DVD release with a 2.20:1 non-anamorphic widescreen transfer in 2000, as part of the Walt Disney Gold Classic Collection line, featuring an art gallery, a new game The Quest for the Black Cauldron, and the 1952 Donald Duck short Trick or Treat. In 2008, Disney announced a Special Edition DVD release of the film to be released in 2009, but was re-advertised as a "25th Anniversary Edition" and released on September 14, 2010, in the US and UK. It contained the original 2.35:1 anamorphic widescreen transfer, the new Witch's Challenge game, an unfinished deleted scene, and all of the features from the 2000 DVD release.

In November 2019, the film was released in 4K for the launch of Disney+. On May 4, 2021, the film was finally released on Blu-ray exclusively through Disney Movie Club.

Theme parks 
Costumed versions of the characters from the film have made occasional appearances at the Disney Parks and Resorts mostly in Fantasyland.

In 1986, the eatery Lancer's Inn at Walt Disney World, was renamed Gurgi's Munchies and Crunchies. Eventually, in 1993 it was closed and then remodeled into Lumiere's Kitchen, The Village Fry Shoppe, and currently The Friar's Nook.

On July 11, 1986, Tokyo Disneyland opened Cinderella Castle Mystery Tour, a walk-through attraction in which the Horned King makes an appearance. The attraction was in operation until 2006. To tie in with the attraction's opening, a 14-day special event and castle show The Mystery of Cinderella Castle was featured on the Cinderella Castle Forecourt Stage, featuring Mickey Mouse, Donald Duck, and Goofy, with Princess Aurora, Prince Phillip, and Maleficent from Sleeping Beauty. During the battle against Maleficent's forces by Goofy, Donald, Phillip, and Aurora, a cameo appearance is made by Creeper with other Disney villains.

Video game 

The video game The Black Cauldron was designed by Al Lowe of Sierra On-Line and released in 1986. It was made shortly after the first King's Quest game, so it resembles that adventure in many ways. Along with The Dark Crystal it remains one of only a few adventure games by Sierra to be based on films.

In popular culture 
The character of Gurgi was also the inspiration for Andy Serkis's portrayal of Gollum in the Lord of the Rings films.

References

Bibliography

External links 

 
The Black Cauldron at Disney Archives
 
 
 
 
 
 
 The Black Cauldron (point and click video game remake) at SCIprogramming

1980s American animated films
American dark fantasy films
American high fantasy films
American sword and sorcery films
1985 animated films
1985 films
1980s fantasy adventure films
American children's animated adventure films
American children's animated fantasy films
American coming-of-age films
American fantasy adventure films
Animated coming-of-age films
Animated films about friendship
Animated films based on children's books
Animated films based on novels
The Chronicles of Prydain
Films scored by Elmer Bernstein
Films about fairies and sprites
Goblin films
Films about princesses
Films based on American novels
Films based on multiple works of a series
Films directed by Ted Berman
Films directed by Richard Rich
Films produced by Ron W. Miller
Films set in castles
Films set in the Middle Ages
Films set in Wales
Films set in the 7th century
Films with screenplays by Richard Rich
Walt Disney Animation Studios films
Walt Disney Pictures animated films
Films about witchcraft
1980s children's animated films
Animated films based on Celtic mythology
1980s English-language films